The women's rhythmic group all-around gymnastic event at the 2015 Pan American Games was held on July 17–18 at the Toronto Coliseum.

Schedule
All times are Eastern Daylight Time (UTC-4).

Results

References

Gymnastics at the 2015 Pan American Games
2015 in women's gymnastics